Erik Donald Stanley Gudbranson (born January 7, 1992) is a Canadian professional ice hockey defenseman who is currently playing under contract with the Columbus Blue Jackets of the National Hockey League (NHL). He was selected third overall by the Florida Panthers in the 2010 NHL Entry Draft. Gudbranson has previously played for the Florida Panthers, Vancouver Canucks, Pittsburgh Penguins, Anaheim Ducks, Ottawa Senators, Nashville Predators, and Calgary Flames.

Playing career

Junior

Kingston Frontenacs
Gudbranson grew up playing minor hockey for the Gloucester Rangers AA rep teams in the ODHA before playing AAA Minor Midget in the OEMHL with the Ottawa Jr. 67's. He was drafted by the Ontario Hockey League (OHL)'s Kingston Frontenacs in the first round, fourth overall, in the 2008 OHL Priority Selection Draft.

In his rookie season with Kingston in 2008–09, Gudbranson had 3 goals and 22 points in 63 games with the rebuilding Frontenacs, who failed to qualify for the playoffs. He recorded his first career OHL point, getting two assists in a 6–2 loss to the Belleville Bulls on October 1. Gudbranson scored his first career OHL goal on January 23 against Jaroslav Janus of the Erie Otters in a 6–5 overtime loss.

Gudbranson then missed 27 games due to mononucleosis in the 2009–10 season, as he appeared in 41 games with the Frontenacs, scoring 2 goals and 23 points. In the playoffs, Gudbranson had a goal and two assists in seven games as Kingston lost to the Brampton Battalion in the first round of the playoffs. After the season, Gudbranson was awarded the Bobby Smith Trophy, an award given to the OHL Scholastic Player of the Year.

Gudbranson returned to Kingston for the 2010–11 season, where he saw a big improvement in his offensive numbers. Gudbranson scored 12 goals and 34 points in 44 games with Kingston, helping the club to the playoffs. In the playoffs, Gudbranson had a goal and four points in five games as the Frontenacs lost to the Oshawa Generals in the first round.

Professional

Florida Panthers

Gudbranson made the Florida Panthers team for the 2011–12 season and made his NHL debut against the New York Islanders on October 8, 2011. He earned the first point of his NHL career on December 2, 2011, against the Los Angeles Kings, an assist. He scored his first NHL goal against Henrik Lundqvist of the New York Rangers during a 6–1 loss on December 11, 2011. At the end of the season, Gudbranson had two goals and eight points in 72 games, helping the Panthers reach the Stanley Cup playoffs for the first time since the 1999–2000 season. In the playoffs, Gudbranson was held pointless in seven games as Florida lost to the New Jersey Devils in the Eastern Conference Quarterfinals round.

In the 48-game, lock-out-shortened 2012–13 season, Gudbranson appeared in 32 games with Florida, earning four assists, as the club failed to reach the playoffs.

In the 2013–14 season, Gudbranson appeared in 65 games, scoring three goals and providing six assists. His defensive partner for the majority of the season was captain Ed Jovanovski, though he also spent time partnered with Dylan Olsen.

During the 2014–15 season, Gudbranson played in 76 games, scoring four goals and 13 points, both career highs. However, the Panthers failed to qualify for the playoffs for the third consecutive season.

Gudbranson played in 64 games in the 2015–16 season, scoring two goals and nine points, helping Florida into the playoffs for the first time since 2012. During the playoffs, Gudbranson was held off the score sheet in six games, as Florida lost to the New York Islanders in the first round (who won their first playoff series since 1993).

On May 25, 2016, Gudbranson was traded along with a 2016 fifth-round pick to the Vancouver Canucks in exchange for Jared McCann and both a second- and fourth-round pick in the 2016 NHL Entry Draft.

Vancouver Canucks
Gudbranson joined the Vancouver Canucks for the 2016–17 season. He appeared in his first game with the Canucks on October 15, receiving 18:42 of ice time in a 2–1 shootout win over the Calgary Flames. On October 18, 2016, Gudbranson recorded his first point with the Canucks, an assist on a goal by Bo Horvat, in a 2–1 win over the St. Louis Blues. Gudbranson scored his first goal with Vancouver on December 8 in a game against the Tampa Bay Lightning, scoring against Ben Bishop in a 5–1 victory.

In an away game against the Toronto Maple Leafs on November 5, 2016, rookie Troy Stecher took a hit by Leaf enforcer Matt Martin in the third period, prompting a line brawl. Following the game, Gudbranson yelled, "Matt Martin's dead. Everyone can hear that now. F—— dead" on his way to the Canucks' dressing room. He later apologized.

On December 19, Gudbranson underwent season-ending wrist surgery; he had one goal and five assists in 30 games up to that point.

On June 15, 2017, Gudbranson signed a one-year, $3.5 million contract extension with the Canucks for the 2017–18 season.

On October 19, 2017, Gudbranson was assessed a five-minute major penalty for boarding and a game misconduct for a hit on Boston Bruins forward Frank Vatrano. On October 20, 2017, Gudbranson was given a one-game suspension for the hit.

On February 20, 2018, Gudbranson signed a three-year, $12 million contract extension with the Canucks.

Pittsburgh Penguins
After playing in 57 games for Vancouver, and recording 8 points, Gudbranson was traded to the Pittsburgh Penguins on February 25, 2019, in exchange for Tanner Pearson.

On April 12, Gudbranson recorded his first Stanley Cup playoff point, a goal assisted by Evgeni Malkin, during the Penguins' first-round loss to the New York Islanders.

Anaheim Ducks
On October 25, 2019, after playing in seven games with the Penguins to open the 2019–20 season, Gudbranson was traded by Pittsburgh to the Anaheim Ducks in exchange for Andreas Martinsen and a 2021 seventh-round pick. Gudbranson found a role on the Ducks blueline, matching a career-high four goals in just 44 games with Anaheim before the season was paused due to the COVID-19 pandemic.

Ottawa Senators
On October 8, 2020, Gudbranson was traded to his hometown Ottawa Senators in exchange for a 2021 fifth-round draft pick. He was named as an alternate captain ahead of the season, along with Thomas Chabot and Brady Tkachuk. In the pandemic delayed 2020–21 season, adding a veteran presence to the Senators blueline, Gudbranson collected 1 goal and 3 points through 36 regular season games.

Nashville Predators
On April 12, 2021, Gudbranson was traded by the Senators at the trade deadline to the Nashville Predators in exchange for a 7th round draft pick in 2023 and minor league defenseman Brandon Fortunato.

Calgary Flames
On September 10, 2021, Gudbranson as a free agent joined his seventh NHL club, in signing a one-year, $1.95 million contract with the Calgary Flames.

Columbus Blue Jackets
On July 13, 2022, Gudbranson as a free agent joined his eighth NHL club, in signing a four-year, $16 million contract with the Columbus Blue Jackets.

International play

Gudbranson was invited to take part in Canada's 2011 National Junior Team selection camp. He was eventually named to the team. He helped Canada win the silver medal in the World Juniors Championship in 2010–11.

Personal life
Gudbranson's younger brother Alex was selected by the Kingston Frontenacs in the first round of the 2010 OHL Priority Selection Draft. Alex currently plays with the Newfoundland Growlers of the ECHL. Gudbranson's youngest brother, Dennis, is a leukemia survivor.  His sister, Chantal, is a graduate of the University of Guelph with a degree in Marine and Freshwater Biology and also played hockey for the Guelph Gryphons.  Gudbranson is a supporter of Canadian Blood Services and promotes stem cell donation as a result of his brother's battle with leukemia.

Career statistics

Regular season and playoffs

International

References

External links

1992 births
Anaheim Ducks players
Calgary Flames players
Canadian ice hockey defencemen
Canadian people of Norwegian descent
Columbus Blue Jackets players
Florida Panthers draft picks
Florida Panthers players
Franco-Ontarian people
Ice hockey people from Ottawa
Kingston Frontenacs players
Living people
Nashville Predators players
National Hockey League first-round draft picks
Ottawa Senators players
Pittsburgh Penguins players
San Antonio Rampage players
Vancouver Canucks players